Bhavikeri  is a village in the southern state of Karnataka, India. It is located in the Ankola taluk of Uttara Kannada district in Karnataka.

Demographics
 India census, Bhavikeri had a population of 7816 with 3927 males and 3889 females. Bhavikeri village main communities are Nadavaru, Komarapant, Ager, Halakki Vokkaliga, Harikant etc.

Bhavikeri village panchayat is largest panchayat in Ankola.

See also
 Uttara Kannada
 Districts of Karnataka

References

External links
 

Villages in Uttara Kannada district